Sam Mustipher (born August 13, 1996) is an American football center of the National Football League (NFL). He played college football at Notre Dame and was signed by the Bears as an undrafted free agent in 2019.

High school career
Mustipher played football at Our Lady of Good Counsel in Olney, Maryland. He played on both the offensive and defensive lines. As a senior, Mustipher was named to the Maryland consensus all-state team and the USA Today All-USA Washington D.C. team. A consensus top-250 national recruit, he was selected to play in the Under Armour All-America Game in 2014.

Recruiting
Mustipher was a consensus four-star prospect, and received offers from 26 schools, including Alabama, Clemson, Ohio State, and Notre Dame. Mustipher committed to Notre Dame on April 16, 2013. He signed his letter of intent during the signing period in February 2014, and enrolled in August.

College career
Mustipher redshirted the 2014 season. In his sophomore season, he saw action in nine games, primarily on special teams and as a reserve offensive lineman. In 2016 as a junior, Mustipher started all 12 games at center. In his senior season in 2017, Mustipher started all 13 games at center, leading a rushing attack that ran for 3,503 yards and scored 35 touchdowns. In addition, Mustipher did not surrender a sack or quarterback hit all season. In 2018, his graduate season, Mustipher was named a captain and once again started all 12 games at center.

Professional career

Chicago Bears
After going unselected in the 2019 NFL Draft, Mustipher was signed by the Chicago Bears as an undrafted free agent on May 2, 2019. He was waived during final roster cuts on August 31, 2019, and he was subsequently signed to the team's practice squad the next day.

Mustipher was signed to a reserve/future contract with the team at the conclusion of the season on December 30, 2019. Like in 2019, Mustipher was among the Bears' last roster cuts prior to the 2020 season on September 5, 2020, before joining the practice squad the next day. He was promoted to the active roster on October 14, 2020, after James Daniels was placed on injured reserve. He made his NFL debut on special teams against the Carolina Panthers in Week 6. He appeared in his first game on offense as a center the following week against the Los Angeles Rams after Cody Whitehair left the game with an injury.

References

External links
Chicago Bears bio
Notre Dame Fighting Irish bio

1996 births
Living people
People from Owings Mills, Maryland
Players of American football from Maryland
American football centers
Notre Dame Fighting Irish football players
Chicago Bears players